King is the fourth full-length album from Italian symphonic death metal band Fleshgod Apocalypse. The album was released on February 5, 2016 through Nuclear Blast Records. The album was mixed and mastered at Fascination Street Studio in Örebro, Sweden. King is the last album to be released featuring Tommaso Riccardi on vocals and guitar before his departure in October 2017.

Concept

Production 
Due to the high cost of utilizing a live symphonic orchestra, the orchestral sounds for the album were produced using software instruments.

Track listing

Personnel
 Tommaso Riccardi - lead vocals, rhythm guitar
 Cristiano Trionfera - lead guitar
 Paolo Rossi - bass, clean vocals
 Francesco Paoli - drums, backing vocals, additional guitars
 Francesco Ferrini - piano, orchestral arrangements
 Veronica Bordacchini - soprano vocals (Tracks 5, 7, 11)
 Gino Ven Makes - logo
 Jens Bogren - mixing, mastering
 Marco Mastrobuono - engineering, co-production
 Eliran Kantor - artwork

Charts

References

Fleshgod Apocalypse albums
2016 albums
Nuclear Blast albums
Concept albums
Albums with cover art by Eliran Kantor